This is list of original programs distributed by MySpaceTV.

Original programming

Drama

Reality Shows

Documentary

Syndications

International

UK

References 

Myspace
Lists of television series by network